Wissem is a unisex Arabic given name. Notable people with the name include:

 Wissem Hmam (born 1981), Tunisian handball player
 Wissem Hosni (born 1985), Tunisian long-distance runner
 Wissem Ben Yahia (born 1984), Tunisian footballer

Arabic unisex given names